Timothy Tarpeh Weah (born February 22, 2000) is an American professional soccer player who plays as a winger for Ligue 1 club Lille and the United States national team.

Weah made his professional debut for Paris Saint-Germain in 2018, winning Ligue 1 twice and the Trophée des Champions once. He won a Scottish Premiership and Scottish Cup double on loan at Celtic in 2019. He then joined Lille, winning another Ligue 1 title and Trophée des Champions in 2021.

In March 2018, he earned his first senior international cap for the United States. He was part of the squad that won the 2021 CONCACAF Nations League Finals and played at the 2022 FIFA World Cup.

Weah is the son of George Weah, the incumbent President of Liberia, who was previously also a professional soccer player, having won the Ballon d'Or in 1995.

Early and personal life
Weah was born on February 22, 2000, in Brooklyn, New York, to Liberian George Weah (at the time a professional soccer player) and his Jamaican wife Clar. George Weah was elected as the 25th President of Liberia in 2018, after serving three years in the Senate of Liberia.

He has two older siblings, George Jr. and Tita. He spent his early life in Brooklyn, Valley Stream, New York and Pembroke Pines, Florida. Weah is fluent in English and French and enjoys producing trap soul music. He is close friends with fellow soccer player Tyler Adams. His cousin, Kyle Duncan, is also a professional soccer player for New York Red Bulls in Major League Soccer. He has been reported to be related to Liberian-born soccer player Patrick Weah, who was signed to a homegrown player deal by Minnesota United in 2021 at the age of 17, but Patrick Weah has confirmed they are not related.

Club career

Early career 
Weah was taught soccer by his father and played soccer while in Florida for West Pines United, before moving back to New York and joining the Rosedale Soccer Club in Queens, New York, owned by his uncle. Weah played three seasons with BW Gottschee, a team in the U.S. Soccer Development Academy system, and transferred to the New York Red Bulls Academy in 2013. He had a trial with Chelsea at the age of 13. Weah relocated to France in 2014 to join the Paris Saint-Germain Academy. In his first start with the academy team, he scored a hat-trick in an 8–1 victory for PSG over Bulgarian side Ludogorets Razgrad in the UEFA Youth League.

Paris Saint-Germain

On July 3, 2017, Weah signed a three-year professional contract with French club Paris Saint-Germain, joining the club that his father had played for in the 1990s. He spent most of the season with the reserves in the Championnat National 2 and the under-19 squad in the UEFA Youth League.

Weah was named to the first-team squad for a Ligue 1 fixture against Troyes on March 3, 2018, while the club's starting forwards were rested for an upcoming Champions League match. He came on as a substitute in the 79th minute of the match and had a goal-scoring opportunity in stoppage time that was saved by the Troyes goalkeeper. Weah made his first start for Paris Saint-Germain in a 0–0 draw against Caen on the last day of the Ligue 1 season. Weah scored his first competitive goal for PSG during a 4–0 win against Monaco in the Trophée des Champions on August 4, 2018. He scored his first league goal a week later in the club's season opener, a 3–0 win over Caen.

He joined Celtic on a six-month loan on January 7, 2019, and  said that he was "in love" with the club. He made his debut on January 19 as a 69th-minute substitute for Scott Sinclair in a Scottish Cup fourth round match at home to Airdrieonians and scored in a 3–0 win. Weah's second goal for Celtic, and his first in the league, came in a 4–0 victory over St Mirren on January 23. In February 2019 he was added to Celtic's Europa League squad. With Celtic, he won the Scottish Premiership and the team advanced to the Scottish Cup final. Weah's loan spell at Celtic was terminated early by the club in May after he was selected to the US squad for the Under-20 World Cup, causing him to miss the Scottish Cup final.

Lille

On June 29, 2019, Weah signed a five-year contract with Lille, starting on July 1. The undisclosed fee was reported by L'Équipe to be €10 million (then $11.37 million). He made his debut on August 11, starting in a 2–1 home win over Nantes. He played 68 minutes before being substituted for Yusuf Yazıcı. Weah made three appearances for Lille throughout the 2019–20 season, however, he missed most of the season due to injury; Weah suffered two hamstring injuries that kept him out of the bulk of the Ligue 1 season. The first injury occurred in a game against Amiens, keeping him out for six months, then the second occurred during his first match back with the team in a game against Marseille.

Weah made his return from injury during the 2020–21 Ligue 1 season, during Lille's second match of the season. He came on in the 79th minute of the game against Reims for Burak Yılmaz and played 16 minutes. On the next Europa League matchday, Weah started and scored his first goal for Lille in a 3–2 loss against his former club Celtic. On December 16, he came on as a substitute against Dijon and scored his first Ligue 1 goal for Lille, capping off a 2–0 victory. He played 28 games and scored three goals as Les Dogues won their first league title for a decade. On August 1, the team won the 2021 Trophée des Champions 1–0 against PSG in Israel, with Weah playing the last 14 minutes in place of Jonathan David.

On March 19, 2022 Weah was sent off in a 1–0 win at Nantes for a foul on Samuel Moutoussamy, who required assistance to leave the field. He did not score until May 14 in the penultimate league fixture, a 3–1 win at Nice, and followed it a week later with both goals of a home 2–2 tie with Rennes.

International career
In addition to the United States, Weah was eligible to represent France, Jamaica, and Liberia, through residency and his parents' citizenships. Weah stated that his decision to represent the United States "wasn't hard at all" and was based on his love of the country and his teammates. He reportedly turned down offers from the French Football Federation to join the French program.

Youth
Weah has represented the United States on several youth national teams, beginning with a call-up to train with the under-14 team in 2012. Weah was selected to join the under-15 team at the Tournament delle Nazioni in Italy, scoring the winning goal in the final against Austria.

He was called up to the under-17 team, under the management of former under-15 coach John Hackworth, in December 2015 for a series of friendlies in Florida. Weah joined the team for the Montaigu Tournament, which the United States won after he scored in the final against hosts France. At another set of friendlies in Florida, Weah made three substitute appearances and scored twice. He was part of the under-17 squad that finished second in the 2017 CONCACAF U-17 Championship, scoring two goals.

He was selected to represent the United States at the 2017 FIFA Under-17 World Cup in India. In the team's first knockout stage match, Weah scored a hat-trick in a 5–0 victory over Paraguay. The hat-trick was the first one recorded by a United States men's national team player at any level during the knockout stages of a World Cup and the fifth overall for any American male player at a World Cup.

Weah was named in the United States squad for the 2019 FIFA Under-20 World Cup in Poland. He scored twice during the tournament, against Qatar in the group stage to qualify for the knockout stage, and against Ecuador in their quarterfinal defeat.

Senior
Weah made his full debut for the senior national team in a 1–0 friendly win against Paraguay on March 27, 2018, entering the match as a substitute for fellow debutant Marky Delgado in the 86th minute. He was the first player born in the 2000s to earn a senior cap for the United States. During a friendly against Bolivia on May 28, 2018, his first international start, Weah scored his first international goal and became the fourth-youngest player to score for the United States, ahead of Josh Sargent, who scored his first earlier in the match. 

On June 6, 2021 Weah came on as a 60th-minute substitute for Sergiño Dest in a 3–2 overtime win over Mexico in the  CONCACAF Nations League Final at Mile High Stadium in Denver. He scored his first competitive international goal on November 16, opening a 1–1 tie away to Jamaica in 2022 FIFA World Cup qualification. He was part of the squad that reached the last 16 of the final tournament in Qatar, scoring against Wales in the 1–1 tie in the first group game.

Career statistics

Club

International

Scores and results list the United States' goal tally first.

Honors
Paris Saint-Germain
Ligue 1: 2017–18, 2018–19
Trophée des Champions: 2018

Celtic
Scottish Premiership: 2018–19
Scottish Cup: 2018–19

Lille
Ligue 1: 2020–21
Trophée des Champions: 2021

United States  U17 
CONCACAF U-17 Championship runner-up: 2017

United States
CONCACAF Nations League: 2019–20

References

External links

 PSG official profile
 Timothy Weah at US Soccer 
 
 

2000 births
Living people
Sportspeople from Brooklyn
Soccer players from New York City
American soccer players
United States men's youth international soccer players
United States men's under-20 international soccer players
United States men's under-23 international soccer players
United States men's international soccer players
Association football forwards
Association football wingers
Paris Saint-Germain F.C. players
Celtic F.C. players
Lille OSC players
Ligue 1 players
Scottish Professional Football League players
2022 FIFA World Cup players
American expatriate soccer players
Expatriate footballers in France
Expatriate footballers in Scotland
American expatriate sportspeople in France
American expatriate sportspeople in Scotland
African-American soccer players
American people of Jamaican descent
American people of Liberian descent
Children of national leaders
Weah family
21st-century African-American sportspeople
20th-century African-American sportspeople